Mërgim Kida (born 7 August 1997), known professionally as Kidda, is a Kosovo-Albanian rapper.

Life and career 

Mërgim Kida was born on 7 August 1997 into an Albanian family from Gjakovë, Kosovo, in the city of Gävle, Sweden.

Discography

Singles

As lead artist

As featured artist

References 

1997 births
21st-century Albanian rappers
Albanian hip hop singers
Albanian-language singers
Albanian rhythm and blues singers
Albanian songwriters
Kosovan people of Albanian descent
Kosovan rappers
Living people
People from Gävle
Sony Music artists
Swedish people of Albanian descent
Swedish rappers
Swedish rhythm and blues singers
Swedish songwriters